The 2018 Dakar Rally was the 40th edition of the event and the tenth successive year that the event was in South America. The event started in Lima, Peru on 6 January and ran through Argentina and Bolivia, finishing in Córdoba, Argentina on 20 January after 14 stages of competition.

Number of entries

Stages
Distance according to the official website.

Bikes, quads and cars

Trucks and UTVs

Summary
Stage 1 left from Lima on 6 January from the Army General Headquarters (the "Pentagonito") located in the district of San Borja, and extended 273 kilometers to the south, a few kilometers after Pisco taking the South Pan-American Highway. The competitive section consisted of a loop ran in the last 31 kilometers near Pisco. Among the incidents of the stage, the most highlighted was the serious accident suffered by the Portuguese driver Joaquim Rodrigues when he fell from a dune and fractured a lumbar vertebra.

The oldest driver, 76-year old Yoshimasa Sugawara of Japan retired in his 35th Dakar Rally participation on Stage 2. The Toyota of driver Alicia Reina and co-driver Carlos Dante Pelayo, both of Argentina, was burned after catching fire during the Stage 3 in Pisco, Peru. Two-time winner Nani Roma of Spain also retired at the end of Stage 3 when he had sustained head and neck injuries in a crash.

Big troubles on Stage 4 was for two of the favorites, Nasser Al-Attiyah (Team Toyota) and Cyril Despres (Team Peugeot) that have been significantly delayed. The bikes class leader and defending champion Sam Sunderland was airlifted to hospital by helicopter as he quit the race with a frightening back injury. Also, former Chelsea and Tottenham manager André Villas-Boas was taken to hospital when his car crashed into a sand dune, forcing him to retire from the rally.

Notable retirement on Stage 5 was Sébastien Loeb (Peugeot Team Total) due to an injury of his co-driver Daniel Elena. In the quads category, defending champion Sergey Karyakin suffered a crash and broke his arm. Initially, Stage 5 in the truck category was won by class leader Eduard Nikolaev, but later Ayrat Mardeev and Dmitry Sotnikov received a compensation time and took first and second stage positions respectively.

After the rest day, one of bike class favorites Joan Barreda won the Stage 7 by almost three minutes to creep ever closer to the overall lead, but sustained a knee injury. Car class leader Stéphane Peterhansel had a big troubles on Stage 7, hitting a rock that destroyed the left rear corner of his Peugeot and forced him to stop for almost two hours. Despite losing two positions in general standings, Peterhansel come back to fight with Carlos Sainz by winning Stage 8 in southern Bolivia. Stage 9 has been cancelled due to poor weather conditions in Argentina.

Bike class leader Adrien van Beveren could not finish on Stage 10 despite his efforts to keep going after he fell two miles from the finish. Austrian Matthias Walkner takes the advantage of the navigation error made by several rivals. On Stage 11, Joan Barreda, exhausted and nursing a knee injury for the last four days, has withdrawn from the rally despite sitting in second place. Russian Kamaz truck driver Eduard Nikolaev has dominated since the rally start in Peru, but he lost more than 40 minutes on a difficult Stage 11 to new race leader Federico Villagra.

Heavy rain made conditions bad enough that the bike and quad classes were both cancelled for Stage 12. In the truck class, Kamaz's defending champion Eduard Nikolaev closely overhauled Federico Villagra's Iveco to lead the overall standings by just one second before the last two stages. On Stage 3, Villagra attacked but suffered a mechanical troubles and despite battling on for as long as he could, had to abandon the rally, leaving the Russian in total control. In the same time, 13-time champion Peterhansel crashed on Stage 13, damaging the Peugeot 3008 DKR Maxi and lost an hour and his second place in general classification.

Finally, after last short Stage 14, Spanish Carlos Sainz has won the cars class for the second time, the bikes winner was Austrian Matthias Walkner, the quads winner was Chilean Ignacio Casale, the trucks winner was Russian Eduard Nikolaev and the UTVs winner was Brazilian Reinaldo Varela.

Stage results

Cars

Bikes

Quads

Trucks

UTVs

Final standings

Cars

Bikes

Quads

Trucks

UTVs

Entry lists

Bikes

Quads

Cars

Trucks

UTVs

References

Dakar Rally
Dakar Rally
Dakar Rally
Dakar Rally
Sport in Córdoba, Argentina
Dakar Rally